She's Back is the first full-length recorded album by freestyle music artist Debbie Deb, released on November 21, 1995.

Track listing
"(There's A) Party Goin' On" (Old Skool Mix) 3:33
"When I Hear Music" 7:03
"If It's Not One Thing...It's Another" 4:18
"I Wanna Dance" 3:57
"Funky Little Beat" 4:53
"What About This Heart?" 4:57
"Lookout Weekend" 6:04
"I Wanna Work It Out" 2:42
"Someday" 4:09
"Now That You're Gone" 3:48
"All Night Long " 2:44
"(There's A) Party Goin' On" (Moretta's Club Mix) 6:34

1995 debut albums
Debbie Deb albums